"I've Been Thinking" is a song written by Boudleaux Bryant, performed by Eddy Arnold, and released on the RCA Victor label (catalog no. 20-6000). In January 1955, it peaked at No. 2 on Billboards country and western juke box chart (No. 3 on the best seller chart). It spent 25 weeks on the charts and was also ranked No. 10 on Billboards 1955 year-end country and western retail chart and No. 12 on the year-end juke box and disk jockey charts.

See also
 Billboard Top Country & Western Records of 1955

References

Eddy Arnold songs
1955 songs